Brentford Football Club is an English professional football club based in Brentford, Hounslow, London. Between 1897 and 1920, the first team competed in the London League, Southern League and Western League. Since 1920, the first team has competed in the Football League, the Premier League and other nationally and internationally organised competitions. All players who have played in 100 or more such matches are listed below.

Records and notable players 
Ken Coote holds the record for the greatest number of appearances for Brentford, making 559 appearances between 1949 and 1964. As of 2015, three other players have made more than 500 appearances for Brentford – Jamie Bates, Peter Gelson and Kevin O'Connor. The club's goalscoring record is held by Jim Towers, who scored 163 goals in 282 appearances between 1954 and 1961. Adam Forshaw, Denny Mundee, Sam Sodje and Billy Sperrin all finished their Brentford careers on 100 appearances.

Current Brentford players who have made 100 or more appearances for the club are Sergi Canós, Josh Dasilva, Rico Henry, Vitaly Janelt, Pontus Jansson, Mathias Jensen, Bryan Mbeumo, Christian Nørgaard, Ethan Pinnock, David Raya and Ivan Toney.

Key
Appearance and goal totals include matches in the Premier League, Football League, Southern League, London League (1896–1898), FA Cup, League Cup, Football League Trophy, Anglo-Italian Cup, London Challenge Cup, Middlesex Senior Cup, London Junior Cup, Middlesex Junior Cup, West Middlesex Cup, Southern Floodlit Challenge Cup, Football League Jubilee Fund and Empire Exhibition Cup. Substitute appearances are included. Wartime matches are regarded as unofficial and are excluded.
 "Brentford career" corresponds to the years in which the player made their first and last appearances.
 Players listed in bold won full international caps whilst with the club.
 Statistics are correct as of match played 18 February 2023.

Playing positions

Players

Southern League era (1898–1920)

Interwar era (1920–1945)

Post-war era (1945–2000)

21st century (2000–present)

Captains

Notes

References
 General
 
 
 
 Brentford at Soccerbase.
 
Specific

 
Brentford
Players
Players
Association football player non-biographical articles